Sau or SAU may refer to:

Places 
 Sau Reservoir, a Catalan water reservoir in the Ter river, named after the town drowned by its creation
 , a subdivision of the Manatuto Administrative Post of East Timor
 Sao, Kunar, a village in the Kunar Province of Afghanistan where the Sawi language is spoken
 Abbreviation for Saudi Arabia
 A German name for the river Sava

People 
 Eroni Sau, Fiji Sevens Rugby Player
 Sau Lan Wu, Chinese American particle physicist

Universities 
 Saint Ambrose University, in Iowa, US
 Shenyang Aerospace University in China
 Sher-e-Bangla Agricultural University, in Bangladesh
 Sindh Agriculture University in Pakistan
 South Asian University, in India
 Southern Adventist University, in the US
 Southern Arkansas University, in the US
 Southern Arkansas University Tech, in the US
 Spring Arbor University, in Michigan, US

Organisations 
 Sauti ya Umma, a political party in Tanzania
 Social Affairs Unit, a UK think-tank 
 South American Union

Transport 
 SAU. the IATA code for Tardamu Airport, East Nusa Tenggara, Indonesia
 SAU, the National Rail code for St Austell railway station, Cornwall, UK

Other uses 
 One of Three Star Gods, still considered auspicious by the Chinese
 Sau (band), a 1990s Catalan pop group
 Sau (Rotuman king), the title of the Rotuman king
 Sau language (disambiguation), several languages

See also  
 
 Saus, Catalonia, Spain
 Saou, a commune in France
 Sao (disambiguation)
 Saw (disambiguation)